Bengt Sigvard Jonsson (27 February 1923, Bodums socken, Sweden – 17 September 1969, at the same place) was a Swedish cross-country skier and lumberjack. He represented Rossöns IF at club level. He won Vasaloppet in 1956. He died in a drowning accident.

References 

1923 births
1969 deaths
Deaths by drowning
Swedish male cross-country skiers
Vasaloppet winners